George Merritt may refer to:

 George Merritt (businessman) (1807–1873), businessman from New York
 George Merritt (actor) (1890–1977), British film and television actor
 George Merritt (baseball) (1880–1938), outfielder in Major League Baseball
 Whitey Merritt (George Henry Merrit, 1869–1916), Canadian ice hockey goaltender